S55 may refer to:

Aircraft
 Savoia-Marchetti S.55, an Italian flying boat
 Sikorsky S-55, an American helicopter
 Sukhoi S-55, a proposed Russian fighter aircraft

Automobiles 
 BMW S55, an automobile engine 
 Mercedes-Benz S 55 AMG, a luxury car
 Mercury S-55, an American full-size car
 Shorland S55, a British armoured personnel carrier

Rail and transit 
 S55 (New York City bus) serving Staten Island
 S55 (St. Gallen S-Bahn), a former S-Bahn line in Thurgau, Switzerland
 S55 (ZVV), a former line of the Zürich S-Bahn
 FGC line S55, a suburban train line in Catalonia, Spain

Other uses
 S55 (star) in the constellation Sagittarius
 Ariel 1, a British satellite
 County Route S55 (Bergen County, New Jersey)
 Explorer S-55 (satellite), a failed American spacecraft
 , a submarine of the Indian Navy
 Siemens S55, a mobile phone
 Wandandian language